Fior may refer to:

People
 Fior Vásquez (born 1977), Dominican shot putter
 Liza Fior (born 1962), British architect and designer
 Robin Fior (1935-2012), British designer

Places
 San Fior, Treviso, Italy